Phlyctimantis is a genus of frogs in the family Hyperoliidae. They are found in the Sub-Saharan Africa between Liberia and Tanzania.

Species
It contains the following species:
 Phlyctimantis boulengeri Perret, 1986
 Phlyctimantis keithae Schiøtz, 1975
 Phlyctimantis leonardi (Boulenger, 1906)
 Phlyctimantis maculatus (Duméril, 1853)
 Phlyctimantis verrucosus (Boulenger, 1912)

References

 
Hyperoliidae
Amphibians of Sub-Saharan Africa
Amphibian genera
Taxa named by Raymond Laurent
Taxonomy articles created by Polbot